Argyrocheila is a genus of butterflies in the family Lycaenidae. The species of this genus are endemic to the Afrotropical realm.

Species
Argyrocheila bitje Bethune-Baker, 1915
Argyrocheila inundifera Hawker-Smith, 1933
Argyrocheila undifera Staudinger, [1892]

References

Seitz, A. Die Gross-Schmetterlinge der Erde 13: Die Afrikanischen Tagfalter. Plate XIII 72

Poritiinae
Lycaenidae genera
Taxa named by Otto Staudinger